Rebecca Scheiner is a German stage director; she directs operas and musicals. She has worked at the Vienna State Opera and with the Vienna Boys' Choir.

References

External links
Official website

German musical theatre directors
German opera directors
Female opera directors
Living people
Year of birth missing (living people)